Ouvrage Hobling is a lesser work (petit ouvrage) of the Maginot Line.  Located in the Fortified Sector of Boulay, the ouvrage consists of two infantry blocks and two observation blocks, and is located between gros ouvrage Michelsberg and petit ouvrage Bousse, facing Germany. It has been stripped of metals and abandoned.

Design and construction
Hobling was approved for construction by CORF (Commission d'Organisation des Régions Fortifiées), the Maginot Line's design and construction agency, in 1931 and became operational by 1935, at a cost of 14 million francs. The contractor was Gianotti of Nice.

Description
Hobling is a petit ouvrage with four combat blocks. The blocks are linked by an underground gallery with barracks and a utility area (usine).

 Block 1: infantry block with two automatic rifle cloches (GFM)andone twin machine gun embrasure.
 Block 2: infantry/entry block with two GFM cloches, one twin machine gun embrasure and one 47mm anti-tank gun (JM/AC47) embrasure.
 Block 3: infantry block with one GFM cloche and one retractable twin machine gun turret.
 Block 4: observation block with one observation cloche (VDP) and one automatic rifle embrasure.

Casemates and shelters
In addition to the connected combat blocks, a series of detached casemates and infantry shelters surround Hobling, including
 Abri d'Ising: Surface infantry shelter (abri) with two GFM cloches.
 Abri de Férange: Sub-grade abri-caverne with two GFM cloches.

Manning
In June 1940 the garrison comprised 115 men and 4 officers of the 164th Fortress Infantry Regiment (RIF). The commanding officer was Captain Boileau. The Casernement de Férange provided peacetime above-ground barracks and support services to Hobling and other positions in the area. The units were under the umbrella of the 3rd Army, Army Group 2.

History
See Fortified Sector of Boulay for a broader discussion of the Boulay sector of the Maginot Line.
Hobling played no significant role in either the Battle of France in 1940 or the Lorraine Campaign of 1944. After the Second World War it became part of the Mòle de Boulay, a strongpoint in the northeastern defenses against Soviet attack.
Hobling remained under Army control until after 1971, when it was declassified and sold.

Current condition
Sold in 1975, Hobling has been partially stripped by salvagers and is abandoned. The salvage work stopped with the removal of all metals, including cloches and turrets, from two blocks. Hobling was the last ouvrage to be stripped.

See also
 List of all works on Maginot Line
 Siegfried Line
 Atlantic Wall
 Czechoslovak border fortifications

Notes

References

Bibliography
Allcorn, William. The Maginot Line 1928-45. Oxford: Osprey Publishing, 2003. 
Kaufmann, J.E. and Kaufmann, H.W. Fortress France: The Maginot Line and French Defenses in World War II, Stackpole Books, 2006. 
Kaufmann, J.E., Kaufmann, H.W., Jancovič-Potočnik, A. and Lang, P. The Maginot Line: History and Guide, Pen and Sword, 2011. 
Mary, Jean-Yves; Hohnadel, Alain; Sicard, Jacques. Hommes et Ouvrages de la Ligne Maginot, Tome 1. Paris, Histoire & Collections, 2001.  
Mary, Jean-Yves; Hohnadel, Alain; Sicard, Jacques. Hommes et Ouvrages de la Ligne Maginot, Tome 2. Paris, Histoire & Collections, 2003.  
Mary, Jean-Yves; Hohnadel, Alain; Sicard, Jacques. Hommes et Ouvrages de la Ligne Maginot, Tome 3. Paris, Histoire & Collections, 2003.  
Mary, Jean-Yves; Hohnadel, Alain; Sicard, Jacques. Hommes et Ouvrages de la Ligne Maginot, Tome 5. Paris, Histoire & Collections, 2009.

External links
 L'ouvrage du Hobling at alsacemaginot.com 
 Petit ouvrage de Hobling |at lignemaginot.com 
 Hobling (petit ouvrage A23 de) at fortiff.be 

HOBL
Maginot Line
Môle de Boulay